This is a list of singles which have reached number one on the Irish Singles Chart in 1982.

20 Number Ones
Most weeks at No. 1 (song): "The Lion Sleeps Tonight" - Tight Fit, "A Little Peace" - Nicole (5)
Most weeks at No. 1 (artist): Tight Fit, Nicole (5)
Most No. 1s: all artists 1 Number One

See also
1982 in music
Irish Singles Chart
List of artists who reached number one in Ireland

1982 in Irish music
1982 record charts
1982